Moasseseh-ye Kashavarzi Kusar (also Romanized as Mo’asseseh-ye Kashāvarzī Kūs̱ar) is a village in Kuhpayeh-e Sharqi Rural District, in the Central District of Abyek County, Qazvin Province, Iran. At the 2006 census, its population was 15, in 5 families.

References 

Populated places in Abyek County